Miguel Danus (fl. 1690) was a Spanish painter. He was disciple of Carlo Maratta in Italy, whose style he closely followed.

References 

17th-century Spanish painters
Spanish male painters